Opuntia hyptiacantha is a species of plant that belongs to the family Cactaceae. They can be found in Mexico within Durango, Aguascalientes, Zacatecas, San Luis Potosí, Jalisco, Guanajuato, Querétaro, and the State of Mexico.

Classification and description 
It is a tree species, 1.5–5 m high, open branching, sometimes with a canopy almost 2 m in diameter. Defined trunk, 200 x 20 cm, grayish to blackish, spiny, bark with scales in wavy longitudinal bands. Widely obovate cladodios, 22-35 x 15-25 x 1–3 cm, bright, greenish yellow to dark green blue, coated with white wax, pruinous. Epidermis glabra, opaque. Areolas arranged in 10-16 series, 2–3 cm distant from each other, circular pyriforms at the base of the cladode and obovate to piriforms at the top, inclusive, 4–6 mm x 2 mm, brown felt in the center and blackish around the areola. Goloquids0.1–1 cm long, greenish yellow. Thorns 3–8 cm, increasing with age, subulated, slightly angulated, divergent, not adpressed, flattened but not twisted 0.2–2 cm long, white with yellow translucent apex . Flowers 9.5 cm long and 9 cm in diameter in the anthesis, yellow; yellow filaments and anthers, pink style, 6 stigma lobes; external segments spatulated with the mucronized apex, light yellow, with a broad, reddish medium band; interior segments spatulated with the mucronized apex, yellow; pericarpel of 4-4.5 cm long. Fruits obovate to subglobosos, from light red to intense; with pericarpelthick, 1–3 cm wide, acidic, subcircular to obovate areoles, with yellow felt, yellow gland, and spines of ca. 1.2 cm long, deciduous, yellow; red pulp Floral scar 2.2 cm in diameter, almost flat, 0.7 cm deep, xoconostle . Reniform seeds, angled with narrow white aryl and lateral thread rate.

Distinctive features for the identification of this species. 
Black trunk, bark with scales in wavy longitudinal bands. Cladodios yellowish greenish to dark green blueish, covered with white wax, pruinous. Thorns 3–8 cm, subulated, divergent, not adpressed, flattened but not crooked, white with yellow translucent apex. Red fruit with short spines on the top, little sunken floral scar.

Habitat 
The climate where this species is found is Aw (at least one month in which less than 600 mm of rain falls), although there are also some sites with dry climate BS (continental arid climate <600 mm) and Cw (temperate climate wet with dry winter season) The wettest month of summer is ten times higher than the driest month of winter). It can also be found in temperate and cold weather zones, where the humidity conditions are highest, these climates are characteristic of some areas of central Mexico . Average annual temperature is from 20 to 29 °C, the average annual rainfall varies between 300 and 1800 mm.

This species mainly inhabits areas where there is volcanic and stony type soil at altitudes from sea level to 1900m.

Gallery

References

External links 
 Enciclovida has an article on Opuntia hyptiacantha
 Naturalista.

hyptiacantha